The 1994 Asian Taekwondo Championships are the 11th edition of the Asian Taekwondo Championships, and were held at the Ninoy Aquino Stadium, Rizal Memorial Sports Complex. Manila, Philippines from 28 January to 30 January, 1994.

South Korea dominated the competition and won eleven gold medals, Chinese Taipei won four all of them in women's competition and the host nation Philippines won the remaining gold medal.

Medal summary

Men

Women

Medal table

References

 Results

External links
WT Official Website

Asian Championships
Asian Taekwondo Championships
Asian Taekwondo Championships
Taekwondo Championships